Defending champion Yui Kamiji and her partner Marjolein Buis defeated Jiske Griffioen and Aniek van Koot in the final, 6–3, 7–5 to win the women's doubles wheelchair tennis title at the 2017 French Open.

Kamiji and Jordanne Whiley were the defending champions, but did not play together. Whiley partnered Diede de Groot, but was defeated in the semifinals by Buis and Kamiji.

Seeds

Draw

Finals

References
 Draw

Wheelchair Women's Doubles
French Open, 2017 Women's Doubles